The Rainforests of the Atsinanana is a World Heritage Site that was inscribed in 2007 and consists of 13 specific areas in six national parks in the eastern part of Madagascar:

 Marojejy National Park
 Masoala National Park
 Zahamena National Park
 Ranomafana National Park
 Andringitra National Park
 Andohahela National Park

The Rainforests of the Atsinanana are distributed along the eastern part of the island. These relict forests are critically important for maintaining ongoing ecological processes necessary for the survival of Madagascar’s unique biodiversity, which reflects the island’s geological history. Having completed its separation from all other land masses more than 60 million years ago, Madagascar’s plant and animal life evolved in isolation. The rainforests are inscribed for their importance to both ecological and biological processes as well as their biodiversity and the threatened species they support. Many species are rare and threatened especially lemurs and other primates.

See also
 World Heritage Sites in Madagascar
 Illegal logging in Madagascar
 World Heritage Sites in danger

References

External links
 UNESCO description of the parks.
 Rainforests of the Atsinanana – World Heritage Site
"Africa, Rainforests of the Atsinanana, Madagascar"  . UNESCO Organization.

World Heritage Sites in Madagascar
World Heritage Sites in Danger
Madagascar lowland forests
Madagascar subhumid forests